D306 is a state road connecting Zadar in the northern Dalmatia, Croatia to the town of Nin and Vir Island.

The road also serves a number of resorts on the Adriatic coast north of Zadar.

The road, as well as all other state roads in Croatia, is managed and maintained by Hrvatske ceste, state owned company.

Traffic volume 

Traffic is regularly counted and reported by Hrvatske ceste, operator of the road. Substantial variations between annual (AADT) and summer (ASDT) traffic volumes are attributed to the fact that the road connects a number of summer resorts to Croatian motorway network and to the city of Zadar, the regional centre.

Road junctions and populated areas

Sources

State roads in Croatia
Transport in Zadar County